The Southern Alps are a mountain range in New Zealand's South Island.

Southern Alps may also refer to: 

Southern Alps (Europe), a geographically and geologically defined region of the Alps in Europe
Southern Limestone Alps, a geological subdivision of the European Alps
Colloquially, the southern parts of the Alps in general
The Akaishi Mountains, or Southern Alps, in Japan